Rüppell's starling (Lamprotornis purpuroptera), also known as Rueppell's glossy-starling or Rueppell's long-tailed starling, is a species of starling in the family Sturnidae. It is found in Burundi, the Democratic Republic of the Congo, Eritrea, Ethiopia, Kenya, Rwanda, Somalia, South Sudan, Sudan, Chad, Tanzania, and Uganda.

References

Rüppell's starling
Birds of East Africa
Rüppell's starling
Taxonomy articles created by Polbot